Stolec may refer to the following places in Poland:
Stolec, Lower Silesian Voivodeship (south-west Poland)
Stolec, Łódź Voivodeship (central Poland)
Stolec, West Pomeranian Voivodeship (north-west Poland)